Eagle Peak is the highest of the Three Brothers, a rock formation, above Yosemite Valley in California. This independent peak is located just east of El Capitan. John Muir considered the view from the summit to be "most comprehensive of all the views" available from the north wall.

Recreation 
Eagle Peak can be reached by following the Upper Yosemite Falls and Eagle Peak trails. The trailhead is at Camp 4 near Yosemite Village. It passes near Yosemite Falls and affords many views of the valley.

The peak can also be reached form the Tamarack Flat Campground located off the Tioga Pass Road. This trailhead is at the end of a very rough, single lane,  road.

See also
 Three Brothers (Yosemite)

References

Mountains of Mariposa County, California
Rock formations of Yosemite National Park